Nathan Smith Davis Jr. (September 5, 1858 – December 22, 1920) was an American physician and professor. The son of prominent physician and professor Nathan Smith Davis, the younger Davis followed his father into the medical profession. He taught at Northwestern University, where he rose to become dean of the Medical College.

Education
Nathan Smith Davis Jr. was born September 5, 1858 in Chicago, Illinois. He was the son of Nathan Smith Davis, a founder of Northwestern University. The younger Davis attended that university, graduating in 1880 with a B.A. degree and then earning a master's degree. He studied medicine under his father in Chicago, graduating from the Chicago Medical College in 1883.

Medical career
Davis opened a medical office in Chicago. In 1884, he was named an Associate Professor of Pathology at Northwestern University. Two years later, he was promoted to Professor of the Principles and Practice of Medicine and Professor of Clinical Medicine. In 1901, he was named Dean of the Northwestern University Medical College. He was also a trustee of Northwestern.

In 1893, he was named chairman of the Section of Practice in the Illinois State Medical Society. He also served on the council and judicial council of the American Medical Association, and he served as a member of the General Board of Management of the YMCA of Chicago. Davis was a member of the Chicago Academy of Sciences, Art Institute of Chicago, and Chicago Historical Society.

Davis died on December 22, 1920 in Pasadena, California.

Personal life
Davis married Jessie B. Hopkins, the daughter of James Campbell Hopkins, in Madison, Wisconsin on April 16, 1884. They had three children: Nathan Smith III, Ruth (who married biochemist Charles H. Boissevain), and William Deering, a designer (who was briefly married to actress Louise Brooks).

Howard Van Doren Shaw designed a house for Davis in Lake Forest, Illinois in 1898.

Selected publications

Dietotherapy and Food in Health (1909)
Food in Health and Disease (1912)

References

1858 births
1920 deaths
19th-century American physicians
20th-century American physicians
Dietitians
Northwestern University faculty
Physicians from Chicago
People from Lake Forest, Illinois
Northwestern Medicine faculty